Locations named White Lake in the U.S. state of New York include:

 White Lake, Oneida County, New York, a census-designated place
 White Lake (Oneida County, New York), the corresponding lake
 White Lake, Sullivan County, New York, a census-designated place
 White Lake Mountain, a summit in the town of Benson